Blagaj may refer to:

 Blagaj, Mostar, a village near Mostar, Bosnia and Herzegovina
 Blagaj Fort, a medieval fortress near Mostar
 Blagaj, Donji Vakuf, a village in Bosnia and Herzegovina
 Blagaj, Kupres, a village in Bosnia and Herzegovina
 Blagaj Japra, a village near Bosanski Novi, Bosnia and Herzegovina
 Blagaj Rijeka, a village near Bosanski Novi, Bosnia and Herzegovina
 Blagaj, Croatia, a village near Slunj, Croatia
 Blagaj Castle (Croatia), a ruined castle on the Korana, Croatia
  or of Blagaj, of Blagay, Croatian medieval noble family
 Rihard Blagaj or Blagay (1786–1858) Slovene aristocrat and botanist